In the U.S. state of Idaho, U.S. Route 95 (US-95) is a north–south highway near the western border of the state, stretching from Oregon to British Columbia for over ; it was earlier known in the state as the North and South Highway.

Route description
US-95 continues into Idaho from southeastern Oregon as an undivided two-lane highway for the majority of its length.  As it is the state's primary north–south highway, Idaho is in the process of widening US-95 to an Interstate-style divided four-lane highway, from the  Oregon state line in the southwest to Eastport at the northern border with Canada at Kingsgate, British Columbia.

In Oregon, US-95 continues south, crosses into Nevada at McDermitt, and meets Interstate 80 at Winnemucca.

Oregon border to New Meadows

It progresses north-northeast to just west of Marsing, where it meets with the southern terminus of State Highway 55. US-95 then turns briefly west, then north to Homedale, and crosses the Snake River before a junction with concurrent US-20 and US-26 as it passes through Parma.

As it proceeds north near Idaho's western border, US-95 crosses Interstate 84 (exit 3) and US-30 before proceeding north through Payette and  Weiser. It continues on to Midvale, Cambridge, and Council, then climbs into the Payette National Forest, passing the Tamarack sawmill site, and turns east to New Meadows. Here, US-95 joins with Highway 55, the two-lane undivided route that connects to Boise through McCall, Cascade and Horseshoe Bend.

Meadows Valley to Lewiston
US-95 continues north through Meadows Valley north of the junction, then descends  with the Little Salmon River to Riggins, tree-sparse but surrounded by mile-high mountains (vertical drop). Immediately after Riggins, the highway crosses the main Salmon River, crossing from the Mountain Time Zone to the Pacific Time Zone; the current tied-arch Goff Bridge was completed in 1999, replacing the truss edition of 1936; the original bridge was built in 1911 and moved to Stites in 1936. 

The steeper, straighter, and faster multi-lane grade was opened in 1975, after ten challenging years of construction. The two-lane road of 1921 to the east was first paved in 1938; it left the Salmon River at White Bird Creek following it up through the town of White Bird, and then gradually climbed the grade in twice the distance, with multiple switchback curves. The arcs, if combined, would form 37 full 360° circles, an average of 950° per mile (590° per km). Following the completion of the new steel bridge over White Bird Creek, the new routing opened in June 1975, ending a decade of construction. The new Lewiston grade to the north was finished in just over two years.

The highway then travels northwest towards Cottonwood, whose bypass was finished in 1976, then enters the Nez Perce Indian Reservation. New route construction in the early 1990s bypassed the main streets of Ferdinand and Craigmont. The new routing is now above, rather than in, the curvy Lawyers Creek Canyon between the cities, crossing the canyon on an elevated bridge constructed in 1991. Lawyers Canyon is named after Chief Lawyer (c.1801–76) of the Nez Perce, nicknamed for his skill in dealing with the encroaching whites; he is buried in Kamiah. US-95 winds its way westward across the high prairie, near the many timber railroad trestles of the Camas Prairie Railroad, to just east of Winchester.

Until 1960, US-95 was routed through Winchester and descended Culdesac Hill, considered the worst of the three major grades (White Bird, Lewiston), all of which were extremely twisty. After Spalding, it then proceeds towards the bridge over the Clearwater River to join with US-12 and depart the reservation. The current bridge for US-12 upstream at Arrow replaced the old Spalding bridge  ice jams on the river a decade earlier 

After crossing the Clearwater on the new Spalding bridge (1962), US-95 joins with US-12 for  along its north bank, heading westward, adding lanes, and gradually descending toward Lewiston. About midway along the co-sign, the reservation is departed; the highways split several miles later at Lewiston's northeast edge. US-12 briefly turns south to re-cross the river into the city center, and then west to cross the Snake River into Clarkston, Washington.

Lewiston grade to Canada

The multi-lane grade (averaging over 7%) was opened on October 28, 1977, after 27 months of construction and two decades of planning. It replaced the Lewiston Spiral Highway, a narrow and switchback-laden 1917 route to the west with 64 spiral curves and about twice the length; it is visible from a scenic overlook. Similar to the White Bird Hill grade, the descending southbound lanes on the new route have three "runaway truck ramps" to halt any vehicles that experience brake failure.

Just north of the Lewiston grade is a junction with US-195, which proceeds north in Washington to Pullman and Spokane. US-95 continues north in Idaho on the Palouse as a four-lane divided highway (roadcam), completed in October 2007 to Thorn Creek Road, midway between Genesee and Moscow. It then reverts to a two-lane undivided roadway for several miles until Moscow, home of the University of Idaho. Scheduled to be completed first, the divided highway construction between Thorn Creek and Moscow was put on hold, due to new right-of-way and environmental impact concerns.

In Moscow, US-95 is diverted a block to either side of Main Street onto multi-lane one-way arterials: northbound on Washington Street, southbound on Jackson Street. The original couplets of 1981 used existing streets and were later modified to eliminate sharp right angle turns which were difficult for large trucks to safely manage. The north end couplets were completed in the early 1990s, the south end in 2000. The construction on the northeast couplet forced the demolition of a noted Moscow watering hole's original west end in January 1991, after staving off its elimination for over a decade.

North of Moscow, US-95 resumes as an undivided two-lane highway. As it leaves Latah County, it gradually departs the Palouse and enters the lake country region of the north Panhandle. As it enters Benewah County, US-95 enters the Coeur d'Alene Indian Reservation. US-95 intersects State Highway 5 in Plummer. US-95 becomes a four-lane divided highway as it leaves Worley and has an interchange with State Highway 58. This recently completed section bypasses the tribal casino and its Circling Raven golf course. US-95 continues north as a divided highway until just south of the Spokane River, where US-95 enters downtown Coeur d'Alene.

US-95 becomes an arterial street and crosses over Interstate 90 Business (Northwest Boulevard) at an interchange. US-95 crosses Interstate 90 at exit 12 and becomes a divided highway north to Hayden, then as an undivided highway past State Highway 54 and Farragut State Park. After crossing Lake Pend Oreille on the  Sandpoint Long Bridge,  US-95 enters Sandpoint and has a junction with US-2. At the border, US-95 meets BC 95, which continues northeastward in British Columbia to Cranbrook.

As of 2019, ITD had started a construction project at US-95's intersection with State Route 53 to reconfigure the intersection, replacing the current signalized intersection with a Single Point Urban Interchange. The project will straighten out ID 53 over the nearby train tracks, remove an intersection with Garwood Rd with a new bridge, and extend the frontage road on the east side to Garwood Rd.

History
US-95 was established in 1926 as one of the original routes in the American Association of State Highway and Transportation Officials (AASHTO) system of national highways. It originally terminated at U.S. Route 30 north of Parma, near the Oregon state line, and was wholly located within Idaho except for a small segment in Washington state northwest of Lewiston. Prior to the designation, the north–south highway was part of State Highway 24 (the number has since re-purposed for another highway).

An auxiliary route, numbered US 95E, was established in 1927 between Potlatch and Coeur d'Alene and later replaced by US 95 Alternate. A proposal to extend US 95 south was considered by the AASHTO in 1937, but deferred until 1940 while routes in Oregon were improved. US-95 then was extended through Oregon and Nevada to California, terminating near Blythe. A proposal to expand the newly-constructed expressway sections of US 95 into a full-fledged Interstate Highway was considered by the state government in the late 1980s.

Since the 1990s, sections of the highway between Coeur d'Alene and Sandpoint have been widened to four lanes and gained limited-access grade separation.

Major intersections

See also

Special routes
 U.S. Route 95 Alternate: current state highways 6, 3, and 97 from Coeur d'Alene to Potlatch
 U.S. Route 95 Spur (Weiser, Idaho)
 U.S. Route 95 Spur (Payette, Idaho)

Related routes
 U.S. Route 195
 U.S. Route 95E
 U.S. Route 95W

References

External links

 Idaho Transportation Dept. – highway roadcams – US-95
 U.S. Dept. of Transportation – Idaho's north–south highway – US-95
 David Rumsey Map Collection – Historic road map (1937) – Idaho, Montana, Wyoming – Texaco (Rand McNally)

 Idaho
95
Transportation in Owyhee County, Idaho
Transportation in Canyon County, Idaho
Transportation in Payette County, Idaho
Transportation in Washington County, Idaho
Transportation in Adams County, Idaho
Transportation in Idaho County, Idaho
Transportation in Nez Perce County, Idaho
Transportation in Latah County, Idaho
Transportation in Benewah County, Idaho
Transportation in Kootenai County, Idaho
Transportation in Bonner County, Idaho
Transportation in Boundary County, Idaho